The Trial of the Sixteen was a staged trial of 16 leaders of the Polish Underground State held by the Soviet authorities in Moscow in 1945. All captives were kidnapped by the NKVD secret service and falsely accused of various forms of 'illegal activity' against the Red Army.

History
The Government Delegate, together with most members of the Council of National Unity and the Commander-in-chief of the Armia Krajowa, were invited by Soviet general Ivan Serov (with agreement of Joseph Stalin) to a conference on their eventual entry to the Soviet-backed Provisional Government. Some historical accounts say approaches were made in February, with others saying March 1945. The Polish politicians were presented with a warrant of safety, but were instead arrested in Pruszków and brutally beaten by the NKVD on 27 and 28 March. Leopold Okulicki, Jan Stanisław Jankowski and Kazimierz Pużak were arrested on the 27th with 12 others the following day. Alexander Zwierzyński had been arrested earlier. They were brought to Moscow for interrogation in the Lubyanka.

After several months of brutal interrogation and torture they were presented with trumped up accusations of:
Collaboration with Nazi Germany
Carrying-out intelligence gathering and sabotage at the rear of the Red Army
State terrorism
Planning a military alliance with Nazi Germany
Owning a radio transmitter, printing machines and weapons
Propaganda against the Soviet Union
Membership in underground organisations.

The trial took place between 18 and 21 June 1945 with foreign press and observers from the United Kingdom and United States present. The date was chosen carefully to be at the same time as a conference on the creation of the Soviet-backed Polish puppet government was organized. The verdict was issued on 21 June, with most of the defendants coerced into pleading guilty by the NKVD. General Okulicki's witnesses for the defense were declared unreachable "owing to bad atmospheric conditions", and no evidence was offered during the trial. Of the sixteen defendants, twelve were sentenced to prison terms ranging from four months to ten years, while charges against the four others were dropped by the prosecution.

Immediately after the arrest of all the leaders, the Polish government in exile sent a protest note to Washington and London demanding their release. At first the Soviets declared that the whole case was a bluff by the "Fascist Polish government". When they finally admitted that the leaders had been arrested (on 5 May), the American envoy of Harry S. Truman, Harry Lloyd Hopkins, was told by Joseph Stalin that "there is no point in linking the case of the Trial of the Sixteen with the support for the Soviet-backed government of Poland because the sentences will not be high." Both British and American governments shared this view.

People involved
 Lt. General Vasili Ulrikh, notable for playing a major role in the Great Purge trials, served as the main judge and issued the following sentences:
Commander in Chief of the Armia Krajowa, Leopold Okulicki (Niedźwiadek) – 10 years in prison, may have been murdered on Christmas Eve of 1946 but may have died due to complications caused by hunger strike.
Deputy Prime Minister of Poland and the Government Delegate, Jan Stanisław Jankowski – 8 years in prison, never released, died in a Soviet prison on 13 March 1953, two weeks before the end of his sentence; probably murdered.
Minister of Internal Affairs, Adam Bień – 5 years
Deputy Minister of Internal Affairs, Stanislaw Jasiukowicz – 5 years
Head of the Council of National Unity and PPS-WRN socialist party – Kazimierz Pużak – 1.5 years, released in November 1945 and returned to Poland. Refused to emigrate, Pużak was again arrested by the Urząd Bezpieczeństwa in 1947 and sentenced to 10 years in prison; died 30 April 1950
Deputy head of the Council of National Unity and head of the Labor Party, Aleksander Zwierzyński – 8 months
Member of the Council of National Unity, Kazimierz Bagiński – 1 year, later released and forced to emigrate to the United States
Member of the Council of National Unity, Head of Zjednoczenie Demokratyczne, Eugeniusz Czarnowski – 6 months
Member of the Council of National Unity, Head of the Labor Party, Józef Chaciński – 4 months
Member of the Council of National Unity, Stanisław Mierzwa – 4 months
Member of the Council of National Unity, Zbigniew Stypułkowski – 4 months, later released and forced to emigrate to the United Kingdom
Member of the Council of National Unity, Franciszek Urbański – 4 months
Member of the Council of National Unity, Stanisław Michałowski – acquitted of all the charges
Member of the Council of National Unity, Kazimierz Kobylański – acquitted of all the charges
Member of the Council of National Unity, interpreter for the group, Józef Stemler – acquitted of all the charges
Deputy Government Delegate – Antoni Pajdak was sentenced to 5 years in prison in a secret trial in November; he was not released until 1955.

Aftermath

In his book, Europe at War, Norman Davies described it as "obscene", that there was no official protest abroad. As a result of the trial, the Polish Secret State was deprived of most of its leaders. Its structures were soon rebuilt, but were never able to fully recover. On 6 July 1945 the United Kingdom and the United States withdrew support for the legitimate Polish government in exile, and all its agendas in Poland. Soviet and Polish Communist repressions aimed at former members of the Polish Secret State and the Armia Krajowa lasted well into the 1960s, corporal Józef Franczak being killed in a shootout with paramilitary-police in 1963.

See also
 Anti-Polonism
 Western betrayal

References

Further reading

English language
 Norman Davies, Rising '44: The Battle for Warsaw. Viking Books, 2004. . Hardcover, 784 pages.
 Jan Karski, Story of a Secret State. Simon Publications, 2001. . Paperback, 391 pages.
 Edward Raczynski, In allied London, Weidenfeld and Nicolson, 1962 pp. 284–285, 295
 Zbigniew Stypulkowski, "Invitation to Moscow", 1950, 1951.

Polish language
 Waldemar Strzałkowski, Andrzej Krzysztof Kunert, Andrzej Chmielarz, Proces Szesnastu. Dokumenty NKWD. Oficyna Wydawnicza RYTM, Warsaw, 1995. . Paperback, 543 pages.
 Eugeniusz Duraczyński, Generał Iwanow zaprasza. Przywódcy podziemnego państwa polskiego przed sądem moskiewskim. Warsaw, Wydawnictwo ALFA, 1989.

External links
The Moscow Trial of the 16 Polish Leaders. Liberty Publications, London, 1945, 24 pages, 2 ill. Electronic version, via Internet Archive.
 Michael Sayers and Albert E. Kahn, "The Case of the Sixteen". Chapter 24 of The Great Conspiracy: The Secret War Against Soviet Union, a pro-Soviet view of the trial. Excerpt archived 4 January 2013.

1945 in the Soviet Union
Political repression in the Soviet Union
1945 in Poland
Political and cultural purges
Poland–Soviet Union relations
Soviet show trials
Soviet military occupations
Stalinism in Poland
1945 in international relations
1945 in case law
Anti-communism in Poland